Heteroclytomorpha sormeoides is a species of beetle in the family Cerambycidae. It was described by Per Olof Christopher Aurivillius in 1908.

Subspecies
 Heteroclytomorpha sormeoides ammiralis Breuning, 1956
 Heteroclytomorpha sormeoides salomonum Breuning, 1950
 Heteroclytomorpha sormeoides sormeoides Aurivillius, 1908

References

Homonoeini
Beetles described in 1908